The Sustainable Land Use Forum (SLUF) is a local Ethiopian non-governmental organization established in 1995 in Addis Ababa. It is a network of like-minded organizations under the name “NOVIB Partners Forum on Sustainable Land Use in Ethiopia and Eritrea”. The organisation was established due to data received from a 1994 study exposing severe land degradation and unsustainable population dynamics in Ethiopia and Eritrea. Partnerships with Eritrean organizations were discontinued due to the war between the two countries in 1998.

NOVIB has been gradually expanding the scope, geographic locations and diversity of its programs in Ethiopia, paving the way for SLUF in February 2002 and renamed as Sustainable Land Use Forum. In accordance with the Charities and Societies Proclamation No. 621/2009, SLUF was re-registered as an Ethiopian Residents Charities Consortium with certificate no. 0523 in November 2009.

SLUF is a membership organization where membership is open to all organizations engaged in Sustainable Land Use and Natural Resources Management. As of 2014 it had 29 members consisting of 3 international and 26 local NGOs. One of the international NGOs is an Honorary Member.

External links

Sustainable agriculture
Sustainability organizations
Environment of Eritrea
Environment of Ethiopia
Charities based in Ethiopia
Environmental organizations established in 1995
1995 establishments in Ethiopia